Dogondoutchi is a department of the Dosso Region in Niger. Its capital lies at the city of Dogondoutchi. As of 2011, the department had a total population of 682,289 people.

References

Departments of Niger
Dosso Region